Superstition High School is one of two alternative high schools operated by Mesa Public Schools.

Public high schools in Arizona
High schools in Mesa, Arizona